Delamere may refer to:

Places

Australia
Delamere, Northern Territory, a locality
Delamere, South Australia, a locality
Delamere Air Weapons Range, Northern Territory
Delamere Station (pastoral lease), a cattle station in the Northern Territory

Canada
Delamere, Ontario

England
Delamere, Cheshire
Delamere railway station
Delamere Forest, also in Cheshire
Leigh Delamere, Wiltshire
Tedstone Delamere, Herefordshire

People with the surname
Baron Delamere, a title in the Peerage of the United Kingdom
John Delamere (footballer) (born 1956), Irish footballer
Louise Delamere (born 1969), English actress
Monita Delamere (1921–1993), New Zealand Maori community leader
Neil Delamere (born 1979), Irish comedian
Tuariki Delamere (born 1951), New Zealand politician

See also
 Delamere station (disambiguation)
 Baron Delamer (disambiguation)
 Delamerea
 Delamare, a surname